Gersthofen is a town in the district of Augsburg, in Bavaria, Germany. It is situated on the west bank of the river Lech, approx.  north of Augsburg.

Gersthofen is divided into five districts (German: Stadtteile): Batzenhofen, Edenbergen (with Gailenbach and Gailenbacher Mühle), Gersthofen, Hirblingen, and Rettenbergen (with Peterhof).

Mayors
Josef Helmschrott (CSU): 1947-1952
Georg Wendler (independent): 1952-1967
Karl J. Weiß: (CSU): 1967-1984
Siegfried Deffner (CSU): 1984-2008
Jürgen Schantin (W.I.R., till 2013 CSU): 2008-2014
since May 2014: Michael Wörle (independent)

Born in Gersthofen
 Hans Erdmenger (1903-1943), marine officer in the second World War
 Michael Martin (born 1948), photographer, geographer and author

People related to Gersthofen

 Auguste Piccard (1884-1962), Swiss scientist, physicist and explorer. Piccard started off in 1931 near Gersthofen with his Stratosphere - balloon to a research flight into Higher Air Layers. During this flight he and his assistant Paul Kipfer first reached an altitude of 15,781 meters.

References

Augsburg (district)